The Tuscan gorgia ("Tuscan throat") is a phonetic phenomenon governed by a complex of allophonic rules characteristic of the Tuscan dialects, in Tuscany, Italy, especially the central ones, with Florence traditionally viewed as the center.

Description

  → 
  → 
  → 

(In some areas the voiced counterparts    can also appear as fricative approximants   , especially in fast or unguarded speech. This, however, appears more widespread elsewhere in the Mediterranean, being standard in Spanish and Greek.)

Geographical distribution
Establishing a hierarchy of weakening within the class  is not an easy task.

The phenomenon is more evident and finds its irradiation point in the city of Florence. From there, the gorgia spreads its influence along the entire Arno valley, losing strength nearer the coast. On the coast,  and usually  are not affected.

In the northwest, it is present to some extent in Versilia. In the east, it extends over the Pratomagno to include Bibbiena and its outlying areas, where  are sometimes affected, both fully occlusive  and lenited (lax, unvoiced) allophones being the major alternates.

The Apennine Mountains are the northern border of the phenomenon, and while a definite southern border has not been established, it is present in Siena and further south to at least San Quirico d'Orcia. In the far south of Tuscany, it gives way to the lenition (laxing) typical of northern and coastal Lazio.

History
The Tuscan gorgia arose perhaps as late as the Middle Ages as a natural phonetic phenomenon, much like the consonant voicing that affected Northern Italian dialects and the rest of Western Romance (now phonemicised as in  "friend" (f.) > ), but it remained allophonic in Tuscany, as laxing or voicing generally does elsewhere in Central Italy and in Corsica.

Although it was once hypothesised that the gorgia phenomena are the continuation of similar features in the language that predated Romanization of the area, Etruscan, that view is no longer held by most specialists. 

Instead, it is increasingly accepted as being a local form of the same consonant weakening that affects other speech in Central Italy, extending far beyond, to Western Romance. Support for that hypothesis can be found in several facts:

 The phonetic details of Etruscan are unknown and so it is impossible to identify their continuance.
 There is no mention of the phenomenon until the 16th century, and no trace in older writing (since the gorgia is a phonetic phenomenon, not phonemic, its appearance in writing might not be expected, but it appears in writing in the 19th century).
 The gorgia is less evident in Lucca and does not exist in the far south of Tuscany or in Lazio, where Etruscan settlement was quite concentrated.
 Sociolinguistic studies in Eastern Tuscany (such as Cravens and Giannelli 1995, Pacini 1998) show that the gorgia competes with traditional laxing in the same postvocalic position, suggesting that the two results are phonetically different resolutions of the same phonological rule.
 The gorgia shows all the characteristics of a naturally-developed allophonic rule in its alternations with full plosives ( "house",  "the house",  "three houses").
Similar processes have happened such as in Proto-Germanic (which is why in Germanic languages there are words such as father, horn, tooth as opposed to Italian padre, corno, dente, from Grimm's Law) and during the development of the Hungarian language.

References

Bibliography
Agostiniani, Luciano & Luciano Giannelli. 1983. Fonologia etrusca, fonetica toscana: Il problema del sostrato. Firenze: Olschki.
Cravens, Thomas D. & Luciano Giannelli. 1995. Relative salience of gender and class in a situation of multiple competing norms. Language Variation and Change 7:261-285.
Cravens, Thomas D. 2000. Sociolinguistic subversion of a phonological hierarchy. Word 51:1-19.
Cravens, Thomas D. 2006. Microvariability in time and space: Reconstructing the past from the present, in Variation and Reconstruction, John Benjamins, Amsterdam, pp. 17–36
Giannelli, Luciano. 2000. Toscana. Profilo dei dialetti italiani, 9. Pisa: Pacini.

Izzo, Herbert J. 1972. Tuscan and Etruscan: The problem of linguistic substratum influence in Central Italy. Toronto: University of Toronto Press.

Pacini, Beatrice. 1998. Il processo di cambiamento dell'indebolimento consonantico a Cortona: studio sociolinguistico. Rivista italiana di dialettologia 22:15-57.

See also
Tuscan dialect
Grimm's law

Phonetics